The Varig Flight 850  was an international commercial route operated by the Brazilian airline Varig that departed from Salgado Filho International Airport, in Porto Alegre, to JFK International Airport, in New York, United States, with stopovers scheduled for São Paulo, Rio de Janeiro, Belém, Ciudad Trujilo (now Santo Domingo) and Miami.

On August 14, 1957, the flight departed from Porto Alegre to complete the planned route. In the late morning of August 16, 1957, 50 minutes after take-off from Ciudad Trujillo-General Andrews International Airport in the Dominican Republic, with only 11 crew members, the pilots were forced to make an emergency landing in the Atlantic Ocean, after losing the aircraft's engines number 3 and 4, which had already taken off without engine number 2. With the landing at sea, the tail detached from the plane, causing the disappearance of a flight attendant.

The aircraft
The aircraft was a Lockheed L-1049 Super Constellation built in 1955 with factory number 4610. The machine was handed over to VARIG and approved by the company with the aircraft registration PP-VDA. The four-engine long-haul aircraft was equipped with four air-cooled 18-cylinder double radial engines Wright R-3350 Duplex-Cyclone.

The machine was one of three of this type with which VARIG had started the flights to the United States, the aircraft model was known for its fragile propeller engines, which frequently failed.

Before the accident
On August 14, 1957, the flight piloted by the Captain Geraldo Knippling took off from Salgado Filho International Airport, in Porto Alegre, bound for New York, United States, with stopovers planned in São Paulo, Rio de Janeiro, Belém, Ciudad Trujilo (now Santo Domingo) and Miami.

At 2:00 AM on August 16, 1957, shortly after take-off from Belém, the engine number 2 (left side) suddenly lost power. Despite the incident, the crew normally landed in a scheduled stopover at Ciudad Trujillo-General Andrews International Airport in Santo Domingo, Dominican Republic. In this location, the company reallocated the passengers on other flights.

By designation of the airline, they took off at 11:00 AM on August 16, 1957, to carry out the transfer of the aircraft to the US, towards Miami International Airport, with only the 11 crew and with the failed engine. According to reports by the Captain Knippling in his book, where he narrated the whole story, he had to use the entire runway for takeoff and he had difficulties to reach the cruising altitude due to the lack of that engine.

Forced landing in the Atlantic
After 50 minutes, at 3,000 meters already close to cruising altitude, the engine number 4 accelerated more than normal and pieces of the propeller came off from the aircraft and the hit the engine number 3 right next to it, resulting in a fire, which was quickly controlled by the crew.

However, with only engine number 1 in operation, the plane gradually lost altitude and the pilots, with no airfield in sight, decided to make an emergency landing at sea, in a position located about 500 meters from the coast of Cabarete, district of the city of Sosua, province of Puerto Plata, northern Dominican Republic. The forced landing was relatively successful, but the tail detached from the aircraft, and one flight attendant disappeared.

The plane sank after some time, at a depth of 40 meters, and the crew was rescued by local residents and later taken to Ciudad Trijilo.

See also

Air navigation
Air traffic control
Flight plan
Flight planning
Navigation
Piloting (navigation)
Situation awareness
Varig Flight 820
Varig Flight 254

References

Aviation accidents and incidents in 1957
1957 in Brazil
Accidents and incidents involving the Lockheed Constellation
Airliner accidents and incidents caused by engine failure